The American Civil War was the first in which large armies depended heavily on railroads to bring supplies. For the Confederate States Army, the system was fragile and was designed for short hauls of cotton to the nearest river or ocean port. During the war, new parts were hard to obtain, and the system deteriorated from overuse, lack of maintenance, and systematic destruction by Union raiders.

The outbreak of war had a depressing effect on the economic fortunes of the Confederate railroad industry. With the cotton crop being hoarded under the "King Cotton" theory, railroads lost their main source of income. Many were forced to lay off employees, and in particular, let go skilled technicians and engineers. Due to a general opinion that the war would not last long, initially Confederate rail operators did not seek, nor build, alternative sources of iron for rail construction and repair.

Although railroad contracts to port towns had ceased, due to the combined effects of the cotton export policy and the Union naval blockade, lucrative government contracts were doled out to rail operators with lines supplying men and arms to the front line of Tennessee and Virginia. A consortium of rail operators had decided upon a universal rate for government contracts; "a uniform rate of two cents a mile for men and half the regular local rate for munitions, provisions, and material, and also agreed to accept Confederate bonds at par in payment of government transportation."

In addition, the Confederacy suffered from two key deficiencies in its rail network. First was the route structure: it was built to serve the coastal shipping industry, and most rail lines connected ports and river terminals to points inland. This lack of inter-railway connections made many railroads useless once the Union blockade was in place. Second was break of gauge; much of the Confederate rail network was in the  broad gauge format, but much of North Carolina and Virginia had  lines. Sometimes, as with Montgomery, Alabama, a city was served by two railroads with different gauge and different depots, meaning that through cargo had to be unloaded from one railroad and moved by animal-powered transportation to the other company's station, where it would be re-loaded. Southern railroads west of the Mississippi were isolated, disconnected, and differed widely in gauge. Several of the Northern railroads, in contrast, were complex networks in themselves, and many cities were served by more than one. The fact that most used the same gauge made transfer even easier.

History

1861 
As troop movement began in earnest in May and June 1861, a crippling problem was discovered; many rail lines terminated in towns without connecting to continuing lines. Instead, cargo would have to be unloaded, driven across town, and then reloaded. Soldiers and other passengers would often have to stay overnight to catch a continuing train the next day. When the Confederate government attempted to rectify this problem, they ran into local opposition. Towns preferred the lack of connection which, under the principle of the negative railroad, required the hiring of teamsters and hotel rooms. Railroad operators, while not opposed to connecting lines, were opposed to the possibility of sharing rolling stock with rival companies.

Confederate raids on the Union's most relevant railroad company, the B & O, devastated tracks and rolling stock; the line quit running. However, the North had enough industrial resources to restore operations.

1862
As 1862 opened, the Confederacy  built a  spur off the Orange and Alexandria Railroad at Manassas Junction toward Centreville, Virginia, known as the Centreville Military Railroad. It served to supply the Confederate defenses on the Centreville Plateau along the north side of the Bull Run feed into the Occoquan River.

As the war waged on, attempts were made by railroad operators to acquire railroad supplies abroad, necessitated by the Confederacy's small industrial base. The problem of supplies had become increasingly acute, especially with respect to the already small supply of engines and cars. Stressed by overuse, lacking material to make repairs, and the conscription of men who could make them, rail operators were predicting a breaking point as early as 1862. While railroad operators attempted, throughout the war, to get assistance from the Confederate Congress, the response was either indifferent or hostile.

1863

In mid-1863 the Confederate government finally initiated an overall policy concerning railroads, and even then it was confined solely to aiding the war effort rather than shoring up the weakening economy of the Confederate States of America. New legislation allowed commandeering (under the name of "impressment"), which brought railroads and their rolling stock under the de facto control of the military. Meanwhile, Union victory in the Chattanooga Campaign gave the United States Military Railroad full control of the Nashville and Chattanooga Railroad which after repairs supplied the Atlanta Campaign.

1864

In March 1864, the Confederate Quartermaster-General's Department ordered all passenger trains to give governmental trains the right of way. By mid-1864, all passenger service in the Confederacy had come to a standstill. Transport of goods for civilian use was also affected, exacerbating shortages brought on by wartime devastation, speculation, hoarding, and the Confederacy's impressment policy.

In the last year before the end of the war, the Confederate railroad system was always on the verge of collapse. The impressment policy of quartermasters ran the rails ragged. Feeder lines would be scrapped for replacement steel for trunk lines, and the continual use of rolling stock wore them down faster than they could be replaced.

Union use
As the Union armies pushed further into Confederate territory, they came into possession of former Confederate railway lines, or what was left of them. Confederate troops generally applied a scorched-earth policy towards railroads when they were in retreat. Union troops would often have to rebuild an entire line from scratch for it to be usable.  Late in 1862, when Confederate forces devastated the Mississippi Central Railroad, the Union invasion came to an end. Grant later resumed the attack, pursuing the Vicksburg Campaign along the river, where steamboats could bring supplies. 

Sherman's March to the Sea in late 1864 reversed the roles, the Union army destroying the main line of the Georgia Railroad and others. Due to the vagaries of the war, some lines would be rebuilt six or seven times by differing sides, especially in states like Virginia, where fighting was most intense.

Expansion
Attempts were made to enlarge the Confederacy's rail system by adding or connecting lines. Of the three major rail projects the Confederate congress proposed and funded, only one of them, a connection between Danville, Virginia, and Greensboro, North Carolina, was completed. Although the Confederate constitution forbade internal improvements to aid commerce, nothing within it said anything about improvements to aid wartime defense.

See also
 Economy of the Confederate States of America
 List of railroads of the Confederate States of America
 Railroad guards in the American Civil War
 United States Military Railroad

Notes

References

 Bailey, Joe R. "Union Lifeline in Tennessee: A Military History of the Nashville and Northwestern Railroad," Tennessee Historical Quarterly (2008) 67#2 pp. 106–123 in JSTOR
 Bearss, Edwin C. "Grierson's Winter Raid on the Mobile and Ohio Railroad," Military Affairs (1960) 24#1 pp. 20–37 in JSTOR
 Black III, Robert C. "Railroads in the Confederacy." Civil War History (1961) 7#3 pp: 231-238. online
 Black, III, Robert C. The Railroads of the Confederacy (1952)  excerpt and text search
 Brown Jr., Canter "The Florida, Atlantic and Gulf Central Railroad, 1851-1868," Florida Historical Quarterly (1991) 69#4 pp. 411–429 in JSTOR
 Clark, John Elwood. Railroads in the Civil War: The Impact of Management on Victory and Defeat (LSU Press, 2001)
 Clarke, Robert L. "The Florida Railroad Company in the Civil War," Journal of Southern History (1953) 19#2 pp. 180–192 in JSTOR
 Cotterill, R. S. "The Louisville and Nashville Railroad 1861-1865," American Historical Review (1924) 29#4 pp. 700–715 in JSTOR
 Currie, David P. "Through the Looking-Glass: The Confederate Constitution in Congress, 1861-1865" Virginia Law Review, Vol. 90, No. 5 (Sep., 2004)
 Diamond, William. "Imports of the Confederate Government from Europe and Mexico." The Journal of Southern History, Vol. 6, No. 4 (Nov., 1940)
 Estaville, Jr., Lawrence E. "A Strategic Railroad: The New Orleans, Jackson and Great Northern in the Civil War,"  Louisiana History (1973) 14#2 pp. 117–136 in JSTOR
 
 Huff, Leo E. "The Memphis and Little Rock Railroad during the Civil War," Arkansas Historical Quarterly (1964) 23#3 pp. 260–270 in JSTOR
 Lash, Jeffrey N. "Joseph E. Johnston and the Virginia Railways, 1861-62." Civil War History 35.1 (1989): 5-27. online
 McGuire, Peter S. "The Railroads of Georgia, 1860-1880." The Georgia Historical Quarterly (1932): 179-213. in JSTOR
 Massey, Mary Elizabeth. Ersatz in the Confederacy University of South Carolina Press, Columbia. 1952
 Partin, Robert. "The Civil War in East Tennessee as Reported By a Confederate Railroad Bridge Builder," Tennessee Historical Quarterly (1963) 22#3 pp. 238–258 in JSTOR
 Ramsdell, Charles W. "The Confederate Government and the Railroads" The American Historical Review (1917) 22#4  in JSTOR
 Riegel, R.E. "Federal Operation of Southern Railroads during the Civil War." Mississippi Valley Historical Review (1922) 9#2 in JSTOR
 Turner, Charles W. "The Virginia Central Railroad at War, 1861-1865," Journal of Southern History (1946) 12#4 pp. 510–533 in JSTOR
 Turner, Charles W. "The Virginia Southwestern Railroad System at War, 1861-1865," North Carolina Historical Review (1947) 24#4 pp. 467–484 in JSTOR
 Turner, George E.  Victory Rode the Rails The Strategic Place of the Railroads in the Civil War (1953)

External links
 Confederate Railroads

Economic history of the American Civil War
Economic history of the Confederate States of America
History of rail transportation in the United States